The tenth edition of the Caribbean Series (Serie del Caribe) was played in 1958. It was held from February 8 through February 13 with the champions teams from Cuba, Tigres de Marianao; Panama, Carta Vieja Yankees; Puerto Rico, Criollos de Caguas and Venezuela, Industriales de Valencia. The format consisted of 12 games, each team facing the other teams twice. The games were played at Sixto Escobar Stadium in San Juan, P.R.

Summary
Cuba won the Series with a 4-2 record en route for a third straight championship (fifth overall). Managed by Napoleón Reyes, the team received offensive support from 2B Casey Wise (.407 BA), CF Solly Drake (.333) and LF Minnie Miñoso (.318). The pitching staff was led by Pedro Ramos (2-1, 18 strikeouts) and Bob Shaw (1-0, 1.69 ERA and no walks in 16 innings). The Cubans, who failed to hit a home run in the Series, also had 1B Julio Bécquer and C Ray Noble in addition to pitchers Mike Fornieles and Bill Werle. The Marianao club became the first repeat champions in the Series history.

Panama, led by catcher/manager Wilmer Shantz, posted a 3-3 record to tie the second place with Puerto Rico. The Panamanian squad got fine work of pitchers Humberto Robinson (2-0, 1.00 ERA, including a four-hit shutout) and Carl Duser (1-0, 3.00), while 3B Héctor López hit .474 with a .609 SLG.

Puerto Rico was guided by Ted Norbert and received a strong pitching performance from Juan Pizarro (1-0, 2.76   innings), who set two strikeout records with 17 in a game (#2) and 29 overall (12 in game 10). The Caguas attack was guided by 1B Víctor Pellot Power (.458 BA, eight RBI, .583 SLG) and CF Roberto Clemente (.391, six runs, .609 SLG), while P Jerry Nelson (1-1, 0.00 ERA) allowed three unearned runs over 18 innings. Other roster members included Mike Goliat (2B), Luis [Canena] Márquez (OF), Félix Mantilla (SS), José [Pantalones] Santiago (P) and Valmy Thomas (C).

Venezuela, piloted by Regino Otero, finished in last place with a 2-4 record. The offensive was anchored by catcher and Series MVP Earl Battey (.435 BA, four RBI, .739 SLG), 1B Lou Limmer (.381, two HR, five RBI, .762 SLG) and RF Bob Wilson, who won the batting title with a .500 BA (12-for-24) while collecting one home run, five runs, four RBI and a .708 SLG. For the second time, Limmer led the tournament in home runs. Pitchers Ramón Monzant (1-1, 3.95) and José Bracho (1-2, 4.37) got the victories for Valencia. OF Elio Chacón (.217, four runs, 3B, one RBI) and SS Chico Carrasquel (.240, four runs, two RBI) also homered in the Series. Besides, Julián Ladera made two relief appearances and struck out 10 batters in  innings of work.

Final standings

Scoreboards

Game 1, February 8

Game 2, February 8

Game 3, February 9

Game 4, February 9

Game 5, February 10

Game 6, February 10

Game 7, February 11

Game 8, February 11

Game 9, February 12

Game 10, February 12

Game 11, February 13

Game 12, February 13

Statistics

Sources
Antero Núñez, José. Series del Caribe. Jefferson, Caracas, Venezuela: Impresos Urbina, C.A., 1987.
Gutiérrez, Daniel. Enciclopedia del Béisbol en Venezuela – 1895-2006 . Caracas, Venezuela: Impresión Arte, C.A., 2007.

External links
Official site
Latino Baseball
Series del Caribe, Las (Spanish)
 
  
 

Caribbean
Caribbean Series
International baseball competitions hosted by Puerto Rico
Sports in San Juan, Puerto Rico
1958 in Caribbean sport
1958 in Puerto Rican sports
Caribbean Series